Mosharrafeh or Mosharfeh or Mosherfeh or Moshirafeh may refer to:
 Mosharrafeh-ye Bozorg
 Mosharrafeh-ye Kuchak